RaaShaun Casey (born September 3, 1977), known professionally as DJ Envy, is an American disc jockey (DJ), record producer, and radio personality. He is one of the two hosts of the syndicated radio show The Breakfast Club, alongside Charlamagne tha God, on Power 105.1.

Education 
Casey graduated from Hampton University in 1999 with a degree in business management.

Career 

A native of Queens, New York City, DJ Envy, then called DJ Shrimp, was tutored and mentored by neighborhood acquaintance DJ Clue, who introduced him to the mixtape circuit in the mid-1990s.  DJ Clue took him under his wing to assist in his success as a disc jockey. By the early 2000s, he was hosting commercials and exclusives for other established artists that include Hahflamez, Jay-Z, 50 Cent, and The Lox. He then was signed to DJ Clue's  record label Desert Storm. In 2003, he released his debut studio album entitled The Desert Storm Mixtape: Blok Party, Vol. 1.

DJ Envy's big break on the radio came when he began mixing once a month for Hot 97 show, "Takin' it to the Streets", hosted by Angie Martinez from 12 am to 4 am, but later filled in when Martinez became pregnant. He then co-hosted Hot 97's morning show with Miss Jones from 6 am to 10 am daily. His run on the morning show ended in July 2008 when Miss Jones moved to Philadelphia, Pennsylvania. DJ Envy spun on his own mix shows on Hot 97 called "The People's Mix" on Saturdays from 12 pm to 2 pm and "The People's Choice Hit List" on Sundays from 5 pm to 8 pm. He had a segment on Hot 97 titled "New at 2", where he played the newest hits from 2 pm to 2:30 pm. He previously hosted his own midday show on Power 105, before joining Charlamagne tha God and Angela Yee as co-hosts of The Breakfast Club. He currently hosts a weekly show on Sirius XM Radio's Hip-Hop Nation.

On Monday, December 6, 2010, DJ Envy, Angela Yee, and Charlamagne tha God began hosting the morning show on Power 105 as The Breakfast Club. In September 2016, he voiced support for stop-and-frisk and later apologized after constant criticism.

DJ Envy has made appearances on Juelz Santana's and Lloyd Banks's music video "Beamer Benz or Bentley" and various television shows, such as 106 & Park, Entourage, and Tha Corner, which he hosts on the Music Choice channel.  He was featured in the 2006 film Blood of a Champion, credited as Shadow's enemy friend. He also appeared in documentary, The Raw Report: Gucci Mane. On March 21, 2010, DJ Envy took over as VJ of MTV2's Sucker Free Countdown.

In early 2015, DJ Envy released single "Still A Fan", featuring recording artist, songwriter, and producer "Rico Love." In early 2017, DJ Envy and his wife, Gia Casey, began hosting a podcast named The Casey Crew that "explores the good, bad, ugly, and beauty of relationships and family".

DJ Envy and his wife, Gia Casey, released a book, titled Real Life, Real Love: Life Lessons on Joy, Pain, and the Magic That Holds Us Together on April 19, 2022

A car enthusiast, DJ Envy is the founder and curator of the Drive your Dreams Car Show auto show, which was first held on November 3, 2018, at Meadowlands Exposition Center in Secaucus, New Jersey.  The second annual event took place On September 7, 2019, at the same venue. Both were sponsored by Lincoln Tech.  After the COVID-19 pandemic canceled events in 2020, the show returned in 2021, traveling to Atlantic City, New Jersey, Atlanta, Georgia, and Detroit, Michigan. Approximately 5,000 people showed up at the TCF Center to witness luxurious cars, souped-up cars, and designer cars owned by celebrities and Detroit residents.

Prior to naming the show the Drive your Dreams Car Show, DJ Envy dubbed his car show as "Carchella". Following a legal notice from Coachella threatening a lawsuit, and a preliminary injunction and restraining order approved by the presiding judge, DJ Envy ceased using the name "Charchella"and reintroduced his car show under its name. 

"I try to take the car shows to markets I'm already successful in, so we started in the New York/New Jersey area, then we went out to Atlanta, we went to Atlantic City, Philly. … Now we're in Detroit, and next month (December 2021) is a holiday show in Miami, Florida".  Autos owned by other celebrities are also featured in the exhibition, including cars courtesy of 50 Cent, Fabolous, Icewear Vezzo, 42 Dugg, and Detroit's Royce da 5'9" and Richard Wershe Jr.(White Boy Rick).

The next scheduled show is Sunday, June 19, 2022, at the NRG Park in Houston, Texas.

Awards and recognition 
On January 24, 2020, Mayor Marty Small of Atlantic City, New Jersey, officially declared January 23 as "Breakfast Club Day" in Atlantic City. DJ Envy was separately presented with an official Key to the City of Atlantic City for his "outstanding efforts to market and promote Atlantic City."

In August 2020, DJ Envy and his Breakfast Club co-hosts, Angela Yee and Charlamagne tha God were inducted into the Radio Hall of Fame.

Personal life 
Casey is married to Gia Casey, who is of Chinese-Jamaican heritage.

He is a resident of Kinnelon, New Jersey.

Discography

Albums 
The Desert Storm Mixtape: Blok Party, Vol. 1 (2003)
The Co-Op (with Red Café) (2007)
It's Moovin''' (2009)Love and Envy (2011)Audio Uprising, Vol. 1 (2011)Full Breach. Vol. 5 (2014)
F2D Presents Hall of Fame 2 (with DA L.E.S. & DJ D Double D) (2018)Just A Kid From Queens'' (2018)

Production 
"Feel the Hate" – The Murderers (2000)
"Broken Silence" – Foxy Brown (2001)
"The Bad Guy" (featuring Pain in da Ass) – Fabolous (2001)
"Right/Wrong" (Cradle 2 the Grave OST) – DMX (2003)
"Getting Down" (Cradle 2 the Grave OST) – DMX, Kashmir, Bazaar Royale (2003)
"Wait a Minute" – Joe Budden (2004)

References 

1977 births
Desert Storm Records artists
African-American radio personalities
American hip hop DJs
Living people
Mixtape DJs
People from Kinnelon, New Jersey
People from Queens, New York
Sirius Satellite Radio
St. Francis Preparatory School alumni
Hampton University alumni
21st-century African-American people
20th-century African-American people